Khorosheye is a rural locality (a selo) in Serebropolsky Selsoviet, Tabunsky District, Altai Krai, Russia. The population was 277 as of 2013. There are 2 streets.

Geography 
Khorosheye is located 40 km northeast of Tabuny (the district's administrative centre) by road. Serebropol is the nearest rural locality.

References 

Rural localities in Tabunsky District